Tyler Hall may refer to:

Tyler Hall (basketball) (born 1997), American basketball player
Tyler Hall (American football) (born 1998), American football player
Tyler City Hall, city hall of Tyler, Texas